The second season of the television series Live PD began airing October 6, 2017, on A&E in the United States. The season concluded on August 25, 2018 and contained 81 episodes.

Departments

Departments returning from season one
 Richland County (SC) Sheriff's Department
 Utah Highway Patrol/Utah State Bureau of Investigation
 Clark County (IN) Sheriff's Office
 Jeffersonville (IN) Police Department
 Greenville County (SC) Sheriff's Office (taped segments only)
 Spokane County (WA) Sheriff's Office
 Lake County (IL) Sheriff's Office
Mission (TX) Police Department (Returned S02E75 "08.10.18") 
Departments debuting in season two
El Paso (TX) Police Department
Pasco County (FL) Sheriff's Office
Streetsboro (OH) Police Department
Pinal County (AZ) Sheriff's Office
Slidell (LA) Police Department
Nye County (NV) Sheriff's Office
Fort Bend County (TX) Sheriff's Office
Greene County (MO) Sheriff's Office
Gwinnett County (GA) Sheriff's Office
Warwick (RI) Police Department

italics indicates a department that returned for season three

Episodes

References

Live PD
2017 American television seasons
2018 American television seasons